The year 1626 in music involved some significant events.

Events
Tarquinio Merula returns to Cremona.
Paolo Agostino succeeds Vincenzo Ugolini as conductor of the pope's orchestra in St. Peter's Basilica.

Bands formed
Les Vingt-quatre Violons du Roi

Publications

Classical Music
Paolo Agostino – Second book of masses, for four voices
Gregor Aichinger –  (Augsburg: Johann Ulrich Schönigk)
Adriano Banchieri – , Op. 49 (Venice: Bartolomeo Magni)
Antonio Brunelli –  for one, two, three, four, and five voices, Op. 15 (Venice: Bartolomeo Magni)
Giovanni Battista Buonamente – , published in Venice
Camillo Cortellini –  for eight voices (Venice: Alessandro Vicenti)
Carlo Farina – 
Melchior Franck
 for five voices (Coburg: Johann Forckel), a New Year's motet
 for five voices (Coburg: Kaspar Bertsch), a wedding motet
 for six voices (Coburg: Kaspar Bertsch), a birthday motet
 for eight voices (Coburg: Johann Forckel for Friedrich Gruner)
 for three voices (Nuremberg: Simon Halbmayer), a motet in Latin and German
Giovanni Girolamo Kapsberger –  (Rome: M. Privii)
Giovanni Pasta – , book 1 (Venice: Alessandro Vincenti)
Johann Hermann Schein – Opella nova (Little new works), volume 2, a collection of sacred concertos

Theory and Practice
Francisco Correa de Arauxo –  (Alcala: Antonio Arnau), a book on the theory and practice of organ playing

Opera
Domenico Mazzochi – La catena d'Adone

Births
August 12 (baptized) – Giovanni Legrenzi, Italian composer (died 1690)
date unknown
Wolfgang Carl Briegel, organist and composer (died 1712)
Marusia Churai, composer, poet and singer (died 1689)
probable – Louis Couperin, French harpsichordist and composer (died 1661)

Deaths
February 20 – John Dowland, composer and lutenist (born 1563)
May 17 – Joan Pau Pujol, organist and composer (born 1570)
June – Samuel Rüling, poet and composer (born 1586)
November – Thomas Weelkes, English composer (born 1576)
date unknown
John Cooper, English composer (born c.1570)
Giovanni Priuli, organist and composer
probable – Francesco Rognoni Taeggio, composer